Marcel Vasiľ (born 9 February 2001) is a Slovak professional footballer who plays as an attacking midfielder for Železiarne Podbrezová, on loan from Bruk-Bet Termalica Nieciecza.

Club career
In January 2022, Vasiľ joined Košice on half-season loan.

On 31 August 2022, he was sent on season-long loan to Železiarne Podbrezová.

International career
Vasiľ enjoyed his first Slovakia U21 national team recognition on 17 March 2022 under Jaroslav Kentoš ahead of two 2023 Under-21 European Championship qualifiers against Northern Ireland and Spain, when he was listed as an alternate to the 23-player squad.

References

External links

Futbalnet profile 

2001 births
Living people
Sportspeople from Prešov
Slovak footballers
Slovak expatriate footballers
Slovakia youth international footballers
Association football midfielders
MFK Karviná players
KS ROW 1964 Rybnik players
Bruk-Bet Termalica Nieciecza players
FC Košice (2018) players
FK Železiarne Podbrezová players
2. Liga Interregional players
III liga players
I liga players
Ekstraklasa players
2. Liga (Slovakia) players
Expatriate footballers in Switzerland
Expatriate footballers in the Czech Republic
Expatriate footballers in Poland
Slovak expatriate sportspeople in Switzerland
Slovak expatriate sportspeople in the Czech Republic
Slovak expatriate sportspeople in Poland